Diplodia corticolaa is a species of anamorphic fungus in the family Botryosphaeriaceae.

References

Botryosphaeriaceae
Fungi described in 2004